The fifth season of The Fairly OddParents started on . In this season, the show aired its seventh TV movie, Fairy Idol, and two Jimmy Timmy Power Hour movies. After "The Jerkinators", the series and Jimmy Neutron seem to end, but later in 2006, they aired episodes that chronologically come before the season finale. After the latter ended its run on November 25, 2006, The Fairly OddParents was sent on hiatus for 15 months, between November 2006 and February 2008. It was produced by Frederator Studios and Nickelodeon Animation Studio.

Season 5 was the last season to be distributed by Nelvana International and so is the last to air on Disney Channel and Jetix (depending on the country).

Episodes

DVD releases

References

2005 American television seasons
2006 American television seasons
The Fairly OddParents seasons